The following is a list of bishops who currently lead dioceses of the Episcopal Church in the United States and its territories. Also included in the list are suffragan bishops, provisional bishops, coadjutor bishops, and assistant bishops. The dioceses are grouped into nine provinces, the first eight of which, for the most part, correspond to regions of the US. Province IX is composed of dioceses in Latin America.



Dioceses and bishops

See also
 Historical list of bishops of the Episcopal Church in the United States
 List of the Episcopal cathedrals of the United States

Notes

Bishops of the Episcopal Church (United States)
Lists of Anglican bishops and archbishops